Alfred Widdowson (16 September 1900–1970) was an English footballer who played in the Football League for Coventry City and Notts County.

References

1900 births
1970 deaths
English footballers
Association football forwards
English Football League players
Notts County F.C. players
Coventry City F.C. players
Newark Town F.C. players
Heanor Town F.C. players